The Huron Daily Tribune is a daily newspaper in Bad Axe, Michigan. The newspaper serves Huron County, in the upper part of "The Thumb". Its parent company, Huron Publishing Company, is owned by Hearst Corporation.

References

External links 

 Huron Daily Tribune

Newspapers published in Michigan
Huron County, Michigan
Hearst Communications publications